John May (May 1844 – 29 December 1917) was a member of the Queensland Legislative Assembly.

Biography
May was born in Kent, England, to parents John May and his wife Mary (née James). He attended the Royal Agricultural University and while still in England worked in the mercantile marine. When he arrived in Queensland he worked as a miner and a drover.

On 14 October 1909 he married Maria Ellen Mellor (died 1928). It is not known if he had been previously married. He died in December 1917 after falling under a train at Eagle Junction station and was buried at Toowong Cemetery.

Political career
May, representing the Labor Party, was the member for Flinders from 1907 until his death in 1917.

References

Members of the Queensland Legislative Assembly
1844 births
1917 deaths
Burials at Toowong Cemetery